Qeshlaq-e Amir (also Romanized as Qeshlāq-e Amīr) is a village in Qareh Naz Rural District, in the Central District of Maragheh County, East Azerbaijan Province, Iran. At the 2006 census, its population was 44, in 12 families.

References 

Towns and villages in Maragheh County